Neogrotella is a genus of moths of the family Noctuidae erected by William Barnes and Foster Hendrickson Benjamin in 1922.

Species
 Neogrotella confusa Barnes & Benjamin, 1922
 Neogrotella macdunnoughi Barnes & Benjamin, 1922
 Neogrotella spaldingi (Barnes & McDunnough, 1913)

References

Stiriinae